Jackson Township is one of twelve townships in Jackson County, Indiana, United States. As of the 2010 census, its population was 20,042 and it contained 8,741 housing units.

History
Bell Ford Post Patented Diagonal "Combination Bridge", Low Spur Archeological Site (12J87), and Sand Hill Archeological Site 12J62 are listed on the National Register of Historic Places.

Geography
The streams of Buck Creek, Heddy Run, Myers Branch, Sandy Branch and South Fork Creek run through this township.

Cities and towns
 Seymour (vast majority)

Unincorporated towns
 Hangman Crossing
 Kriete Corner
 New Farmington

Adjacent townships
 Redding Township (north)
 Spencer Township, Jennings County (east)
 Washington Township (south)
 Brownstown Township (west)
 Hamilton Township (west)

Cemeteries
The township contains six cemeteries: Crane, Driftwood, Farmington, Gardner, Lutheran and Saint Ambrose.

Major highways
  Interstate 65
  U.S. Route 31
  U.S. Route 50
  State Road 11
  State Road 258

Airports and landing strips
Freeman Municipal Airport

References
 
 United States Census Bureau cartographic boundary files

External links
 Indiana Township Association
 United Township Association of Indiana

Townships in Jackson County, Indiana
Townships in Indiana